COMPAREX AG is an international company for IT services with headquarters in Leipzig, Germany. Following a takeover by SoftwareOne COMPAREX AG announced on April 1, 2019 that all its subsidiaries will undergo a rebranding process and fully integrate into the SoftwareOne Group.

Business field 
COMPAREX AG is mainly involved in the management of software licenses and usage rights as well as in IT consulting and the development of Managed Services and cloud-based solutions.

Corporate structure 
The Executive Group at COMPAREX AG consisted of the Board of Directors and the Vice Presidents. Since being acquired by SoftwareONE in February 2019, COMPAREX AG's corporate structure is undergoing restructuring with Marc Betgem (CSO) to serve on SoftwareONE's Executive Leadership Team and Thomas Reich, the former CEO of COMPAREX, supporting the integration process before leaving the company.

Board of Directors 
The Board of Directors at COMPAREX AG currently consists of two people:
Thomas Reich (CEO/Chairman, since December 2017 and CFO since 2009)
Marc Betgem (CSO/Director, since July 2016)

Supervisory Board 
The Supervisory Board at COMPAREX AG has five members: 
Michael Kafesie (Chairman of the Supervisory Board at COMPAREX AG)
Nikolaus Brajkovic (Member of the Supervisory Board at COMPAREX AG)
Andreas Fleischmann (Member of the Supervisory Board at COMPAREX AG)
Thomas Muchar (Member of the Supervisory Board at COMPAREX AG)
Oliver van Haentjens (Member of the Supervisory Board at der COMPAREX AG)

Shareholders 
Raiffeisen Informatik GmbH has owned 100 percent of COMPAREX AG since 2011; it holds these shares indirectly via “PERUNI” Holding GmbH. Raiffeisen Informatik GmbH belongs to the Raiffeisen Banking Group Austria (RBG).

Shareholdings 
COMPAREX AG holds shares in companies around the world due to its strategy of acquisitions and start-ups.

Locations 
A number of acquisitions in recent years mean that COMPAREX AG is now present in 35 countries worldwide.

Europe
Germany, Austria, Switzerland, Italy, Spain, France, Luxembourg, Belgium, Netherlands, Great Britain, Denmark, Norway, Sweden, Finland, Russia, Ukraine, Poland, Czech Republic, Turkey, Slovenia, Serbia, Bulgaria, Slovakia, Romania
Asia
India, Kazakhstan, China, Singapore, Indonesia
South America
Brasil
North America
Canada, Mexico, USA

Origins 
The company has operated under the name COMPAREX AG since 2011. Originally the company was named "PC-Ware Gesellschaft für Industrieinformatik Leipzig mbH".

References

External links 
 Website der COMPAREX AG

International information technology consulting firms
ICT service providers
Information technology consulting firms of Germany
Software companies of Germany